The Initiated is a 1989 Soviet drama film directed by Oleg Teptsov.

Plot 
The film tells about a man who has the ability to punish people with the strength of his spirit, but can he use it?

Cast 
 Gor Oganisyan as Volodya
 Lyubov Polishchuk as Mother
 Aleksandr Trofimov as Frolov
 Yelena Bragina as Vera
 Sergey Makovetskiy as Lyokha
 Vladimir Simonov as Dumb
 Gabriel Vorobyov as Nikolay
 Olga Samoshina as Sveta
 Alisa Fomina
 David Oganisyan

References

External links 
 

1989 films
1980s Russian-language films
Soviet drama films
1989 drama films
Rediscovered Soviet films
1980s rediscovered films